Manuela Sara Rejas Phowell (born ) was a Peruvian female weightlifter, competing in the +75 kg category and representing Peru at international competitions. 

She participated at the 2004 Summer Olympics in the +75 kg event. She competed at world championships, most recently at the 2003 World Weightlifting Championships.

Major results

References

External links
 

 http://www.todor66.com/weightlifting/World/2003/Women_over_75kg.html

1978 births
Living people
Peruvian female weightlifters
Weightlifters at the 2004 Summer Olympics
Olympic weightlifters of Peru
Place of birth missing (living people)
20th-century Peruvian women
21st-century Peruvian women